The 2004 Hong Kong Legislative Council election was held on 12 September 2004 for members of the Legislative Council of Hong Kong (LegCo). The election returned 30 members from directly elected geographical constituencies and 30 members from functional constituencies, of which 11 were unopposed.

An unprecedented number of 3.2 million people registered to vote in the election. The turnout rate was an unprecedented 55.6% with 1,784,406 voters casting ballots, beating the previous record set in 1998 by 200,000 votes. While pro-democratic opposition candidates gained new seats in the legislature, their gains fell short of their expectations.

In the geographical constituencies, candidates from the pro-democratic camp secured 60 percent of the seats in the geographical sectors of the election, taking 18 seats (up from 17) in this category, and 62 percent of the popular vote. On the other hand, the pro-Beijing and pro-business candidates made greater gains, winning 12 directly elected seats (up from 7). In the functional constituencies which the pro-democratic camp sought to abolish, the camp made more gains (from 5 to 7 seats).

Overall, the democrats took 25 seats and the pro-government camp 35 seats. Bills initiated by the government can still be passed on pro-government support alone, but bills originated by members cannot be passed without democratic support, since these bills require absolute majorities in each sector (geographical and functional) of the legislature. Constitutional amendments require a two-thirds vote and thereby also require support from the democratic camp.

Despite the increase in the number of seats returned by geographical constituencies and the record turnout, the Democratic Party lost the status of being the largest political party in the Legislative Council to the pro-government Democratic Alliance for Betterment of Hong Kong, DAB, who secured 12 seats if including the two members who ran under the banner of the Hong Kong Federation of Trade Unions, and pro-business Liberal Party who secured 10 seats, thereby becoming only the third-largest party. Some attributed the poor performance of the pro-democratic camp to tactical miscalculation in vote allocation. This was not helped by some of the democratic parties' personal scandals.

The pro-Beijing and pro-business parties succeeded in retaining the majority in the legislature. However, pro-democracy candidates have maintained the threshold to block changes, if necessary, to the Basic Law of Hong Kong, since a two-thirds vote is required for amendment. The current Legislative Council also saw the entry of more radical members of the democratic camp.

Change in composition
According to the Annex II of the Basic Law of Hong Kong, the 6-seat Election Committee constituency indirectly elected by the 800-member Election Committee would be abolished, while the directly elected geographical constituency seats would increase from 24 to 30, same number of the indirectly elected functional constituencies. As a result, Hong Kong Island and Kowloon East was added one extra seat each, from five to six and four to five respectively, and the New Territories West and New Territories East was added two extra seats each, from six to eight and five to seven respectively, while the number of seats in Kowloon West remained four.

Background
The election came amidst the deteriorating governance and intense debates over constitutional reforms in Hong Kong. The Tung Chee-hwa administration had been embattling with economic recession brought by the 1997 financial crisis and the more prominent SARS outbreak in 2003. Nevertheless, the Tung administration push forward the controversial Hong Kong Basic Law Article 23 legislation which outlawed "treason" and "subversive activities" and raised concerns on its potential threats against Hong Kong people's civil liberties. A group of barristers formed the Basic Law Article 23 Concern Group and rallied against the national security legislation. Over 500,000 people to protested on 1 July 2003, the sixth anniversary of the establishment of the HKSAR, against the legislation, the largest demonstration since the handover. The Article 23 legislation further crippled the Tung administration as the government saw its popularity dropped to a new low. The Democratic Alliance for the Betterment of Hong Kong (DAB), the largest pro-Beijing party saw its largest defeat in the District Council elections in November 2003, which alarmed the Beijing and the Hong Kong government.

The Annex I and Annex II of the Basic Law state that the method for selecting the Chief Executive and for forming the Legislative Council could be amended after 2007. The pro-democracy camp argued that the third term of Chief Executive and fourth term of Legislative Council should be elected on the basis of universal suffrage in 2007 and 2008 as stipulated in the Article 45 and 68 of the Basic Law respectively. In 2004, the Article 23 Concern Group transformed into the Article 45 Concern Group calling for the early implementation of the universal suffrage. Facing the pro-democracy pressure for full democratisation, in April 2004, the National People's Congress Standing Committee (NPCSC) ruled out the 2007/08 universal suffrage.

Retiring incumbents
With the cancellation of the Election Committee constituency, there were total of twelve incumbents chose not to run for re-election. Ip Kwok-him lost his seat in the Central and Western District Council therefore was not qualified for running in the District Council functional constituency.

Opinion polling

Results

Before election:

Change in composition:

|-
! style="background-color:#E9E9E9;text-align:center;" rowspan=2 colspan=3|Parties and allegiances
! style="background-color:#E9E9E9;text-align:right;" colspan=4 |Geographical constituencies
! style="background-color:#E9E9E9;text-align:right;" colspan=4 |Functional constituencies
! style="background-color:#E9E9E9;text-align:right;" rowspan=2 |Totalseats
! style="background-color:#E9E9E9;text-align:right;" rowspan=2 |±
|-
! style="background-color:#E9E9E9;text-align:right;" |Votes
! style="background-color:#E9E9E9;text-align:right;" |%
! style="background-color:#E9E9E9;text-align:right;" |±pp
! style="background-color:#E9E9E9;text-align:right;" |Seats
! style="background-color:#E9E9E9;text-align:right;" |Votes
! style="background-color:#E9E9E9;text-align:right;" |%
! style="background-color:#E9E9E9;text-align:right;" |±pp
! style="background-color:#E9E9E9;text-align:right;" |Seats
|-
|rowspan=6 style="text-align:left;background-color:Pink;border-bottom-style:hidden;"|
|style="background-color:"|
| style="text-align:left;" |Democratic Alliance for the Betterment of Hong Kong 
|402,420
|22.73
|5.67
|8
| –
| –
| –
|2
|10
|
|-
|style="background-color:"|
| style="text-align:left;" |Liberal Party 
|118,997
|6.72
|4.84
|2
|6,126
|4.71
|0.25
|8
|10
|2
|-
|style="background-color:"|
| style="text-align:left;" |Hong Kong Federation of Trade Unions 
|52,564
|2.97
|N/A
|1
|566
|0.44
|N/A
|2
|3
|2
|-
|style="background-color:"|
| style="text-align:left;" |Hong Kong Progressive Alliance 
|14,174
|0.80
|1.15
|0
|17
|0.01
|0.14
|0
|0
|4
|-
|style="background-color:"|
| style="text-align:left;" |New Century Forum 
|4,511
|0.25
|1.35
|0
| –
| –
| –
| –
|0
|1
|-
| style="background-color:"|
| style="text-align:left;" |Pro-government individuals and others
|69,306
|3.92
| –
|1
|36,313
|27.91
|–
|11
|12
|−
|-style="background-color:Pink"
| style="text-align:left;" colspan=3 |Total for pro-Beijing camp
|661,972
|37.40
|2.46
|12
|43,022
|33.07
|6.78
|23
|35
| 4
|-
|rowspan=9 style="text-align:left;background-color:LightGreen;width:1px;border-bottom-style:hidden;"|
|style="background-color:;width:1px"|
| style="text-align:left;" |Democratic Party 
|445,988
|25.19
|6.47
|7
|48,323
|37.15
|8.48
|2
|9
|2
|-
| style="background-color:"|
| style="text-align:left;" |Article 45 Concern Group 
|117,216
|6.62
|N/A
|3
|2,597
|2.00
|N/A
|1
|4
|2
|-
| style="background-color:"|
| style="text-align:left;" |The Frontier 
|121,900
|6.89
|0.11
|1
|–
|–
|–
|–
|1
|1
|-
|style="background-color:"|
| style="text-align:left;" |Hong Kong Association for Democracy and People's Livelihood 
|74,671
|4.22
|0.53
|1
|–
|–
|–
|–
|1
|0
|-
|style="background-color:"|
| style="text-align:left;" |Hong Kong Confederation of Trade Unions 
|69,844
|3.95
|3.38
|1
|–
|–
|–
|–
|1
|0
|-
|style="background-color:"|
| style="text-align:left;" |April Fifth Action 
|60,925
|3.44
|2.06
|1
|–
|–
|–
|–
|1
|1
|-
|style="background-color:"|
| style="text-align:left;" |Neighbourhood and Worker's Service Centre 
|59,033
|3.33
|1.17
|1
|–
|–
|–
|–
|1
|0
|-
|style="background-color:"|
| style="text-align:left;" |Hong Kong Social Workers' General Union 
|–
|–
|–
|–
|3,199
|2.46
|N/A
|0
|0
|0
|-
| style="background-color:"|
| style="text-align:left;" |Pro democracy individuals and others
|155,812
|8.80
| –
|3
|27,594
|21.21
|–
|4
|7
|−
|-style="background-color:LightGreen"
| style="text-align:left;" colspan=3 |Total for pro-democracy camp
|1,105,388
|62.44
|1.88
|18
|81,713
|62.81
|7.00
|7
|25
| 4
|-
| style="background-color:" |
| style="text-align:left;" colspan=2 |Non-partisan individuals and others 
| 2,830
| 0.16
| –
| 0
| 5,351
| 4.11
| –
| 0
| 0
|−
|-
|style="text-align:left;background-color:#E9E9E9" colspan="3"|Total
|width="75" style="text-align:right;background-color:#E9E9E9"|1,770,190
|width="40" style="text-align:right;background-color:#E9E9E9"|100.00
|width="40" style="text-align:right;background-color:#E9E9E9"|
|style="text-align:right;background-color:#E9E9E9"|30
|width="75" style="text-align:right;background-color:#E9E9E9"|130,086
|width="40" style="text-align:right;background-color:#E9E9E9"|100.00
|width="40" style="text-align:right;background-color:#E9E9E9"|
|style="text-align:right;background-color:#E9E9E9"|30
|width="30" style="text-align:right;background-color:#E9E9E9"|60
|style="text-align:right;background-color:#E9E9E9"|0
|-
|style="text-align:left;background-color:#E9E9E9" colspan=13| 
|-
|style="text-align:left;background-color:#E9E9E9" colspan="3"| Valid votes
|width="75" style="text-align:right;background-color:#E9E9E9"| 1,770,190
|width="30" style="text-align:right;background-color:#E9E9E9"| 99.22
|width="30" style="text-align:right;background-color:#E9E9E9"| 0.08
|width="30" style="text-align:right;background-color:#E9E9E9" rowspan="4" | 
|width="75" style="text-align:right;background-color:#E9E9E9"| 130,086
|width="30" style="text-align:right;background-color:#E9E9E9"| 96.41
|width="30" style="text-align:right;background-color:#E9E9E9"| 0.25
|width="30" style="text-align:right;background-color:#E9E9E9" colspan="3" rowspan="4" | 
|-
|style="text-align:left;background-color:#E9E9E9" colspan="3"| Invalid votes
|width="75" style="text-align:right;background-color:#E9E9E9"| 13,941
|width="30" style="text-align:right;background-color:#E9E9E9"| 0.78
|width="30" style="text-align:right;background-color:#E9E9E9"| 0.08
|width="75" style="text-align:right;background-color:#E9E9E9"| 4,849
|width="30" style="text-align:right;background-color:#E9E9E9"| 3.59
|width="30" style="text-align:right;background-color:#E9E9E9"| 0.25
|-
|style="text-align:left;background-color:#E9E9E9" colspan="3"|Votes cast / turnout
|width="75" style="text-align:right;background-color:#E9E9E9"|1,784,131
|width="40" style="text-align:right;background-color:#E9E9E9"|55.63
|width="30" style="text-align:right;background-color:#E9E9E9"|
|width="75" style="text-align:right;background-color:#E9E9E9"|134,935
|width="40" style="text-align:right;background-color:#E9E9E9"|70.14
|width="30" style="text-align:right;background-color:#E9E9E9"|13.64
|-
|style="text-align:left;background-color:#E9E9E9" colspan="3"|Registered voters
|width="75" style="text-align:right;background-color:#E9E9E9"|3,207,227
|width="40" style="text-align:right;background-color:#E9E9E9"|100.00
|width="30" style="text-align:right;background-color:#E9E9E9"|4.97
|width="75" style="text-align:right;background-color:#E9E9E9"|192,374
|width="40" style="text-align:right;background-color:#E9E9E9"|100.00
|width="30" style="text-align:right;background-color:#E9E9E9"|
|-
| style="text-align:left;" colspan=13 |Source turnout: Electoral Affairs Commission. 11 candidates in 11 functional constituencies were elected unopposed to the Legislative Council.
|} Note: For the joint list of pro-democrats in Hong Kong Island, Kowloon East and New Territories East, the votes are divided equally to each candidate.

Overview
The election was largely seen as a contest between the pro-democracy coalition and the pro-business and pro-Beijing coalitions. There were 162 candidates for 60 seats in the LegCo. Before the election, the pro-democratic camp was widely expected to gain the most votes and increase its representation from 22 seats in the LegCo. Some members of the pro-democratic camp aimed at securing an absolute majority of the seats in the legislature so that they would have the power to veto all government proposals.

The democratic camp called for direct elections for the Chief Executive of Hong Kong in 2007 and for LegCo in 2008, as well as rapid political reform. In contrast, the pro-Beijing and pro-business candidates placed more emphasis on economic growth and social stability. Most of the political parties are now setting 2012 as the ideal time for electoral reform.

While the democratic camp hoped to play up the issue of universal suffrage as a prominent issue in the election, the Standing Committee of the National People's Congress ruled out universal suffrage for the Chief Executive election in 2007 and for LegCo elections in 2008 in April 2004 before the election. Despite this, the pro-democratic camp insisted on promoting their agenda, which seemed to backfire when the campaign lost its original momentum. This was not helped by various sex and financial scandals of a few pro-democracy candidates. There were some allegations by the pro-democracy camp of Mainland Chinese influence behind this.

Some of the developments include:
 Some reports in phone-in radio programmes that some officials in the Mainland requested businessmen to take photographs of their completed ballots with their mobile phones to prove that they have voted for pro-Beijing candidates. In response, the government removed curtains from polling booths to deter such activities.
 The entry into the election race of popular radio show host Albert Cheng, who had accused Beijing of pressuring him to leave his radio program.
 The arrest and sentence (by re-education through labour) of the Democratic Party candidate Alex Ho in Guangdong province of China for (allegedly) being caught and pictured in a hotel bedroom having relations with a prostitute. Although there were some initial predictions that Ho's arrest would help the Democratic Party by highlighting deficiencies in the PRC's judicial system, it is generally agreed that his arrest greatly hurt the party among women voter support in Hong Kong.
 The involvement of Democratic Party James To and The Hong Kong Federation of Trade Unions Chan Yuen-han in scandals relating to the use of public funds for the benefit of their respective political groups.
 Human Rights Watch issued a report a few days before the election, accusing the PRC government of creating a "climate of fear" to influence the election. In response, the Hong Kong government claimed that the report was distorted.
 The assault of a candidate of the Democratic Party in the New Territories East, Wong Sing-chi. The suspect was arrested and reportedly found to be mentally ill.
 The election of radical activist "Long Hair" Leung Kwok-hung, who ran as an independent but who is expected to side with pro-democracy representatives despite his revolutionary leanings.

Irregularities
There were a few reports of irregularities. Some polling stations ran out of ballot boxes, causing long delays in voting. To fit more ballots into the ballot boxes, some election workers forcefully stuffed ballots into the box using objects such as barbecue forks and metal rulers. Some stations also used random cardboard boxes without official seals. Some ballot boxes were opened before the close of polling.

The polling station operating manual had mistakes in it, so some candidate representatives were kicked out after the closing of the poll and were prevented from witnessing the counting, as required by law.

Some candidates have tried to challenge the election results, but have remained unsuccessful thus far.

A report on the election process was published shortly after the election. Another report was commissioned by the government to suggest future improvements.

Votes summary

Seat summary

Incumbents defeated
Eight incumbents lost re-election

Candidate lists and results

Geographical Constituencies (30 seats)
Voting system: Party-list proportional representation with largest remainder method and Hare quota.

Functional Constituencies (30 seats)
Voting systems: Different voting systems apply to different functional constituencies, namely for the Heung Yee Kuk, Agriculture and Fisheries, Insurance and Transport, the preferential elimination system of voting; and for the remaining 24 FCs used the first-past-the-post voting system.

Notes

References

External links
 LegCo Elections 2004

 
2004 elections in China
2004 in Hong Kong
Legislative
Legislative Council of Hong Kong
September 2004 events in China